Pristava pri Mestinju is a settlement in the Municipality of Podčetrtek in eastern Slovenia. It lies on the main road from Podčetrtek to Rogaška Slatina. The area is part of the traditional region of Styria. It is now included in the Savinja Statistical Region.

Name
The name of the settlement was changed from Pristava to Pristava pri Mestinju in 1953.

References

External links
Pristava pri Mestinju on Geopedia

Populated places in the Municipality of Podčetrtek